I'm Still Here: Black Dignity in a World Made for Whiteness is a 2018 memoir by Austin Channing Brown. The book became a bestseller during the mid-2020 resurgence of national interest in racial injustice following the George Floyd protests.

References

Further reading

External links 
 

2018 non-fiction books
American memoirs
Books about race and ethnicity
Books about religion
Penguin Books books
English-language books